Li Dongxu (born October 1956) is a Chinese female scientist and professor at the National University of Defense Technology.

Honours and awards
 November 22, 2019 Member of the Chinese Academy of Sciences (CAS)

References

1956 births
Living people
People from Jinan
Scientists from Shandong
Academic staff of the National University of Defense Technology
Members of the Chinese Academy of Sciences
Educators from Shandong